The Bulgarian Rugby Federation is the governing body for rugby in Bulgaria. It oversees the various national teams and domestic competitions.

Leadership

See also
Rugby union in Bulgaria
Bulgaria national rugby union team

External links
 Bulgarian Rugby Federation 

 
Rugby union governing bodies in Europe
Rugby
Sports organizations established in 1962